Myyrmäki (Finnish) or Myrbacka (Swedish) is a Helsinki commuter rail and bus station located in Vantaa, Finland.

The station is served by circular lines I and P, and is between the stations of Malminkartano and Louhela.

The station has two platforms, one for southbound and one for northbound trains. There is also a waiting room although ticket sales from the station have recently been discontinued. At the moment the nearest place for purchasing long distance tickets would be Pasila. The Myyrmanni shopping centre is situated nearby.

References

External links 

Railway stations in Vantaa
Railway stations opened in 1975